Lucía López Martínez (born January 31, 1974 in Barcelona) is a former female field hockey player from Spain. She was a member of the Women's National Team at three consecutive Summer Olympics, starting in 1996. She played club hockey for Real Club de Polo in Barcelona.

References

External links
 

1974 births
Living people
Spanish female field hockey players
Olympic field hockey players of Spain
Field hockey players at the 1996 Summer Olympics
Field hockey players at the 2000 Summer Olympics
Field hockey players at the 2004 Summer Olympics
Field hockey players from Barcelona